The 4MV planetary probe (short for 4th-generation Mars-Venus probe) is a designation for a common design used for Soviet unmanned probes to Mars and Venus. It was an incremental improvement of earlier 3MV probes and was used for Mars missions 2 to 7 and Venera missions 9 to 16. The same base design was used for some earth-orbiting space observatories.

Design
While Mars 2,3 and Kosmos 419 used the KTDU-425, 4MV buses after 1971 used the KTDU-425A).

Variants
Mars M-71|3MS:Kosmos 419 (M-71|3MS No.170), Mars 2 (M-71 No.171), Mars 3 (M-71 No.172)
Prognoz: Prognoz 1 to 9, Intercosmos 23
Mars M-73|3MS|3MP: Mars 4 (M-73|3MS No.52S), Mars 5 (M-73|3MS No.53S), Mars 6 (M-73|3MP No.50P), Mars 7 (M-73|3MP No.51P)
Venera 4V-1: Venera 9 (4V-1 No.660), Venera 10 (4V-1 No.661), Venera 11 (4V-1 No.360), Venera 12 (4V-1 No.361), Venera 13 (4V-1 No.760), Venera 14 (4V-1 No.761)
Astron: Astron
Venera 4V-2: Venera 15 (4V-2 No.860), Venera 16 (4V-2 No.861)
Granat: Granat

See also 
 Soviet space program
 M-69
 Venera
 3MV

References

 
Soviet Mars missions
Soviet Venus missions
Soviet space probes